L'Eco di Bergamo is an Italian language daily newspaper published in Bergamo, Italy. The paper has been in circulation since 1880.

History and profile

L'Eco di Bergamo was established by the Sesa company in 1880. Its publisher is SESAAB, which is owned by the Bergamo Dioceses. SESAAB also publishes four editions of La Provincia newspaper, namely those of Como, Lecco, Sondrio and Varese.

The headquarters of L'Eco di Bergamo is in Bergamo, and the paper is published in the Berliner format. It is the first Italian newspaper which introduced color.

L'Eco di Bergamo has a Catholic-oriented leaning. An Italian priest Andrea Spada served as the editor-in-chief of the paper for 51 years. He was appointed to the post in 1938 and was in office until 1989.

At the end of the 1990s L'Eco di Bergamo sold 68,000 copies. Its circulation was 56,000 copies in 2007.

References

External links
  

1880 establishments in Italy
Catholic newspapers published in Italy
Daily newspapers published in Italy
Italian-language newspapers
Mass media in Bergamo
Newspapers established in 1880